In mathematics, the nu function is a generalization of the reciprocal gamma function of the Laplace transform.

Formally, it can be defined as

where  is the Gamma function.

See also
 Lambda function (disambiguation)
 Mu function

References

External links
 

Gamma and related functions